The Lane Cove Council is a local government area located on the Lower North Shore of Sydney, New South Wales, Australia.

The Mayor of Lane Cove Council since 10 January 2022 is Cr. Andrew Zbik, the first mayor of Lane Cove representing the Australian Labor Party.

Location 
On the western and southern borders is the Lane Cove River with the Ryde and Hunter's Hill, across the river on the western and southern banks respectively. To the north is the Willoughby and to the east is North Sydney.

Suburbs and localities in the local government area
Suburbs in the Municipality of Lane Cove are:

Localities in the municipality are:
 Blaxlands Corner
 Gore Hill
 Palm Gardens
 Osborne Park

Demographics 
At the  there were  people in the Lane Cove local government area, of these 49.2 per cent were male and 50.2 per cent were female. Aboriginal and Torres Strait Islander people made up 0.3 per cent of the population; significantly below the NSW and Australian averages of 2.9 and 2.8 per cent respectively. The median age of people in the Municipality of Lane Cove was 36 years; slightly lower than the national median of 38 years. Children aged 0 – 14 years made up 18.5 per cent of the population and people aged 65 years and over made up 13.7 per cent of the population. Of people in the area aged 15 years and over, 51.8 per cent were married and 10.4 per cent were either divorced or separated.

At the 2016 census, the population in the Municipality increased by 14.41 per cent. When compared with total population growth of Australia for the same period, being 8.8 per cent, population growth in the Lane Cove local government area was significantly higher than the national average. The median weekly income for residents within the Municipality of Lane Cove was significantly higher than the national average.

Council

Current composition and election method
Lane Cove Municipal Council is composed of nine Councillors elected proportionally as three separate wards, each ward electing three Councillors. All Councillors are elected for a fixed four-year term of office. The Mayor and Deputy Mayor are elected by the Councillors at the first meeting of the council. The most recent election was held on 4 December 2021, and the makeup of the council is as follows:

The current Council, elected in 2021, in order of election by ward, is:

Council history
In May 1865, 67 residents of the rural District of Willoughby, which included what is now Lane Cove, sent a petition to the Governor Sir John Young, requesting the incorporation of the "Municipality of North Willoughby". This resulted in the municipality being formally proclaimed on 23 October 1865.

There were no wards until 1876 when the council was divided into three wards: Chatsworth Ward to the north, Middle Harbour Ward to the east and Lane Cove Ward to the west. Lane Cove Ward subsequently became the separate "Borough of Lane Cove" on 11 February 1895. With the passing of the Local Government Act, 1906, the name was changed to be the "Municipality of Lane Cove" and with the passing of the Local Government Act, 1993, the council legally changed to "Lane Cove Council" and aldermen were retitled councillors.

A 2015 review of local government boundaries by the NSW Government Independent Pricing and Regulatory Tribunal recommended that the Municipality of Lane Cove merge with the councils across the river. In July 2017, the Berejiklian government decided to abandon the forced merger of the Hunter's Hill, Lane Cove and Ryde local government areas, along with several other proposed forced mergers.

Heritage listings
The Lane Cove Council has a number of heritage-listed sites, including:
 Greenwich, 95 River Road: Pallister, Greenwich
 Lane Cove, 334 Burns Bay Road: Carisbrook, Lane Cove
 Lane Cove North, 518 Pacific Highway: Chatswood South Uniting Church
 Linley Point, 360 Burns Bay Road: Linley House
 Northwood, 1 Private Road: Northwood House

See also

Local government areas of New South Wales

References

External links

 Lane Cove Municipal Council website
 

 
Lane Cove
Local government areas in Sydney